The United States ambassador to Namibia is the representative of the government of the United States in Namibia.

The position was created the day Namibia became independent, which was also the day that Namibia-United States relations were established. On that same day, the U.S. Embassy in Windhoek was opened in recognition of the establishment of diplomatic relations.

The U.S. Liaison Office in Windhoek opened February 24, 1984, with William H. Twaddell as Director and closed February 15, 1985. During this time the following officers served as Director: Dennis Whyte Keogh (March–April 1984), Howard Jeter (April–May 1984), and William L. Jacobsen Jr. (May 1984–February 1985). It reopened on June 1, 1989, with Roger A. McGuire as Director. McGuire became chargé d'affaires ad interim when the Liaison Office was elevated to embassy status on March 21, 1990. The first ambassador, Genta H. Holmes was appointed on August 6, 1990. The United States has maintained diplomatic relations with Namibia since that time.

Ambassadors

See also
Namibia – United States relations
Foreign relations of Namibia
Ambassadors of the United States

References

United States Department of State: Background notes on Namibia

External links
 
 Chiefs of Mission for Namibia

Namibia
 
United States